Florence Davis is the President and a member of the Board of Directors of the Starr Foundation. She has served since March 1999.

Biography
Davis graduated Phi Beta Kappa from Wellesley College and then the New York University School of Law where she was a Root-Tilden Scholar. She joined Sullivan & Cromwell in 1979. In 1986, she began working for Morgan Stanley rising to Director of Worldwide Regulatory Affairs. In 1995, she became Vice President and General Counsel at American International Group (AIG).  In 1992, she was named to the 40 under 40 list by Crain’s New York Business magazine.,

Personal life
In August 2009, Davis married Anthony Gooch.

References

Sullivan & Cromwell people
Wellesley College alumni
New York University School of Law alumni
Nonprofit businesspeople
Living people
Year of birth missing (living people)
Directors of Morgan Stanley